Ludlow Church of England School is a coeducational Church of England secondary school located in Ludlow, Shropshire, England.

The school achieved the Technology College specialisation in 2003, and later also became a Sports College, holding the Sportsmark award.

The 2006 Ofsted report called it "a happy school which is improving well," and rated the progress of special education students as "exceptional". It was judged Good in its 2015 inspection. In 2008 the school achieved 56% of students with 5 A*-C grades (including English and maths) on their GCSEs.

Previously a voluntary controlled school administered by Shropshire Council, in April 2017 Ludlow Church of England School converted to academy status. The school is now sponsored by the Diocese of Hereford Academy Trust.

See also
Ludlow College

References

External links
Ludlow CE School, Shropshire Council

Secondary schools in Shropshire
Church of England secondary schools in the Diocese of Hereford
Ludlow
Academies in Shropshire